This is a '''list of public art in Charlotte, North Carolina. 

Art, public
Charlotte
Public art
Public art in North Carolina
Art, public